Radio Narvik was a local radio station which covered the whole of Ofoten, including Narvik, Ankenes, Ballangen and Bjerkvik. The frequency was FM 103,5 and 150,5 in all areas. It was also possible to listen via internet radio. 

In 2005 Radio Narvik was bought by the newspaper Fremover, becoming part of Jærradiogruppen AS. In December 2008, the radio station was closed down due to lack of income.

External links

 Radio Narvik (Norwegian)

Radio stations in Norway
Radio stations disestablished in 2008
Defunct mass media in Norway